Trzciana  is a village in Bochnia County, Lesser Poland Voivodeship, in southern Poland. It is the seat of the gmina (administrative district) called Gmina Trzciana.

The village has a population of 1,462.

References

Trzciana